The island of Alderney has its own currency, which by law must be pegged to that of the United Kingdom (see pound sterling).

Schedule 2 of the Government of Alderney Law provides that the States of Alderney may, by Ordinance, prescribe "the legal currency and denominations of the legal currency, so however that that currency, and those denominations shall be the same in Alderney as in the United Kingdom; and prescribing those notes and coins the tender of which is a legal tender of the payment of money".

In normal use in Alderney, Guernsey and Bank of England banknotes and coins circulate side by side year round, while in the summer tourist season, Jersey notes and coins are also common, as well as Scottish and occasionally even Manx or Northern Irish notes.

Coins

Alderney coins are widely available to collectors but not in general circulation. Since 1989, Alderney has issued occasional commemorative coins of £1, £2 or £5 face value in cupro-nickel, silver or gold.

Banknote

A very rare 1 pound banknote was issued in 1810 by the Alderney Commercial Bank. It is catalogued in the Standard Catalog of World Paper Money as PS181. 1 pound. 26 December 1810. Black. Alderney coat of arms at left.

Exchange rates
The Alderney pound shares the ISO code "GBP" with sterling.

Literature

See also 

 Guernsey pound
 Jersey pound
 Manx pound

References

Currencies of the British Empire
Currencies of the Commonwealth of Nations
Currencies of the Channel Islands
Alderney
Alderney
Banknotes of Europe